Sareban Qoli (also Romanized as Sārebān Qolī and Sārebānqolī; also known as Sarvān Qolī, Sorsan Kuli, and Sorvankuli) is a village in Sis Rural District, in the Central District of Shabestar County, East Azerbaijan Province, Iran. At the 2006 census, its population was 1,340, in 338 families.

References 

Populated places in Shabestar County